Iowa, Iowa can refer to:

Iowa City, Iowa
Iowa County, Iowa
Any of several townships in Iowa; see

See also
Iowa (disambiguation)
List of U.S. cities named after their state